Professor Jan Stjernswärd PhD, FRCP(Edin) (born 1936) is an oncologist, specialising in palliative care.

Stjernswärd obtained a medical degree at the Karolinska Institute, and subsequently worked there as an assistant professor in tumour biology and as a specialist in radiotherapy and oncology.

From 1980 to 1986, he worked for the World Health Organization, as their head of cancer. While in that role he instigated development of the 'WHO Three-Step Pain Ladder' and worked to improve cancer care globally.

References

External links

Further reading
 Moen, Ann, red (2006). Vem är det 2007. Svensk biografisk handbok. Malmö: Nationalencyklopedin. sid. 551. Libris 10171521. .
 Uddling, Hans; Paabo, Katrin, red (1992). Vem är det: svensk biografisk handbok. 1993. Stockholm: Norstedt. sid. 1031. Libris 8261513. 

1936 births
Place of birth missing (living people)
Fellows of the Royal College of Physicians of Edinburgh
World Health Organization officials
Swedish oncologists
Karolinska Institute alumni
Academic staff of the Karolinska Institute
Living people
Swedish officials of the United Nations